36 Deadly Styles is a 1980 independent released martial arts film directed by Joseph Kuo starring Jack Long, Mark Long, and Hwang Jang-lee.

Plot 
The pace and tone of the film is immediately made clear with an opening fight in the woods as Wah-jee (Cheung Lik) and his uncle (Sham Chin-bo) attempt to flee from ruthless fighters led by Mien Tsu-mun (Chan Lau). The pair make it to a Buddhist temple, but the uncle dies after Tsu-mun and his thugs break in. A fighter turned monk named Huang (Yeung Chak-lam) manages to kill most of them. Once recovered from his wounds, Wah-jee is put to work at the temple, making soy milk runs into town and cleaning out the smoke-filled oven. He spends time with two junior monks and trades friendly kung fu blows with Tsui-jee (Jeannie Chang), the attractive soy milk seller.

Tsu-mun returns to the area with two martial brothers (including Bolo Leung). Fed up with the torturous regimen of chores at the temple, Wah-jee leaves but overhears Tsu-mun's plans to kill Huang and decides to warn his mentor. A fight ensues that Wah-jee survives only after he is forcibly pulled away by Tsui-jee's father (Fan Mei-sheng). At this point, Wah-jee learns that his own father died at the hands of a silver-haired fighter (Hwang Jang-lee) who belongs to the same group as Tsu-mun. Three martial brothers initially escaped Jang-lee's attack, but now only Tsui-jee's father remains. Wah-jee, Tsui-jee and her father go into hiding where Wah-jee begins to master the 36 Deadly Styles just in time to face Jang-lee.

There is also a smaller parallel plot interwoven with the previous one involving a brother of Jang-lee (Mark Long) who heads off to a Tibetan temple to seek out a kung fu master named Kaung Wu Chun (Jack Lung) in order to get the manual of 36 Deadly Styles.

External links 
 
 
 

1980 films
Hong Kong martial arts films
Taiwanese martial arts films
Kung fu films
Films directed by Joseph Kuo
1980 martial arts films
1980s Mandarin-language films
1980s Hong Kong films